The Other Side of Round Midnight is an album by American jazz saxophonist Dexter Gordon recorded in 1985 and released on the Blue Note label. The album was recorded during the making of Bertrand Tavernier's 1986 film  Round Midnight, and it consists of tracks that were not included in the Academy Award-winning soundtrack album for the film.  The album features the last recordings released under Gordon's name (although he does not appear on all tracks), produced and arranged by Herbie Hancock.

Reception
The Allmusic review by Scott Yanow awarded the album 3 stars and calling it "Not essential but interesting".

Track listing
 "'Round Midnight" (Thelonious Monk) - 7:46
 "Berangere's Nightmare #2" (Herbie Hancock) - 4:35
 "Call Sheet Blues" (Wayne Shorter, Herbie Hancock, Ron Carter, Billy Higgins) - 6:05
 "What Is This Thing Called Love?" (Cole Porter) - 3:35
 "Tivoli" (Dexter Gordon) - 4:10
 "Society Red"  (Dexter Gordon) - 5:30
 "As Time Goes By" (Herman Hupfeld) - 4:15
 "It's Only a Paper Moon" (Harold Arlen, E. Y. Harburg, Billy Rose) - 7:43
 "'Round Midnight" (Thelonious Monk) - 6:28
Recorded live at Studio Eclair, Épinay-sur-Seine, FranceAdditional recording at Studio Davout and Studio Phillipe Sarde, Paris

Personnel
Dexter Gordon - tenor saxophone (tracks 1, 6 & 7), soprano saxophone (5)
Wayne Shorter - soprano saxophone (1), tenor saxophone (3)
Freddie Hubbard (2 & 6), Palle Mikkelborg (1 & 5) - trumpet
Herbie Hancock (1-4 & 7-9), Cedar Walton (5 & 6) - piano
Ron Carter (1-3 & 6), Mads Vinding (1 & 5), Pierre Michelot (7 & 8) - double bass
Billy Higgins (1, 3, 5, 7 & 8), Tony Williams (2 & 6) - drums
Bobby McFerrin - vocals (4, duo with H. Hancock)
John McLaughlin - guitar (7)
Bobby Hutcherson - vibes (8)

References

Blue Note Records albums
Dexter Gordon albums
1986 albums
Albums produced by Michael Cuscuna